JIA is the first solo EP by Meng Jia after her departure from the Korean group Miss A. The EP was initially limited to a digital release, however after requests from fans it was later released physically featuring three songs and a DVD.
"Drip" is a hip hop song with a video featuring choreography by Jonte Moaning and Hwayoung Kim, while "Who's That Girl", written by lyricist Meng Jia and Matthew Yen, is an expression of her own transformation and growth during her time in Miss A and now in her solo career. Both songs were composed by Brian Lee (who has worked with Justin Bieber and Lady Gaga). "Candy" is an EDM song with lyrics about love.

Track listing

Charts

References

Mandopop EPs
2017 EPs